Laburnum railway station is located on the Lilydale and Belgrave lines in Victoria, Australia. It serves the eastern Melbourne suburb of Blackburn, and opened on 13 July 1958.

History
Laburnum station opened on 13 July 1958, and was named after the locality of Laburnum, itself named after the shrub of the same name. The original station had two side platforms, with a substantial brick building on Platform 1, and a small brick shelter on Platform 2. Also occurring in that year was the replacement of hand gates at the former Middleborough Road level crossing with boom barriers. The crossing was located in the Up direction of the station.

The Middleborough Road grade separation project involved lowering the line eight metres below the road. That required the rebuilding of the station, and the removal of the bend in Laburnum Street beneath it. In October 2006, the station buildings were demolished and, on 29 January 2007, the rebuilt station opened. As part of the project, provision was made for the future installation of a third track.

Toot Toot - Drive Slowly sign
Laburnum was once known for having a sign reading "Toot Toot - drive slowly" under the railway bridge which crosses Laburnum Street. Drivers would often sound their car horns, as instructed by the sign, to warn oncoming, but possibly unseen, traffic that might be approaching the narrow underpass. Infuriated neighbours would frequently attempt to remove the sign by painting over it, but to no avail; the local council would restore the sign every time.

When the station was rebuilt following the 2007 grade separation, the road underpass was substantially widened, so the sign was deemed unnecessary and was removed. A plaque commemorating the sign and describing its history was erected, although it too has since been removed.

Platforms and services
Laburnum has two side platforms. It is served by Lilydale and Belgrave line trains.

Platform 1:
  all stations and limited express services to Flinders Street
  all stations and limited express services to Flinders Street

Platform 2:
  all stations services to Lilydale
  all stations services to Belgrave

Transport links
Kinetic Melbourne operates two bus routes via Laburnum station, under contract to Public Transport Victoria:
 : Box Hill station – Ringwood station
 : Box Hill station – Westfield Doncaster (deviation)

Gallery

References

External links
 
 Melway map at street-directory.com.au

Railway stations in Melbourne
Railway stations in Australia opened in 1958
Railway stations in the City of Whitehorse